Lucerapex murndaliana is an extinct species of sea snail, a marine gastropod mollusk in the family Turridae, the turrids.

Description
Dimensions: length 47 mm; breadth 13 5 mm; length of aperture 20 mm.

Original description: 

The protoconch is composed of three elongate whorls, the initial portion being slightly inflated, whilst the anterior turns are obtusely carinate. The shell is narrow and elongate. It contains ten whorls, slightly convex, and has  several bold, irregular, spiral threads or ridges, rather rugose where crossed by growth lines, and somewhat granulated in the neighbourhood of the sinus. The siphonal canal is long, slender, and twisted. The outer lip is serrate. The sinus is large and deep, and situated some distance from the suture.

Distribution
Fossils of this extinct species were found in Middle Miocene strata at Muddy Creek, Hamilton, Victoria, Australia.

References

External links
 GEOLOGICAL TIME SCALE: THE GOUDEY COLLECTION FOSSILS, Mary MacKillop Penola Centre
 Museums Victoria Collections
 A.W.B. Powell, The Australian Tertiary Mollusca of the Family Turridae; Records of the Auckland Institute and Museum; Vol. 3, No. 1 (20th September, 1944)
 Kirstie Rae Thomson  (2013), Evolutionary patterns and consequences of developmental mode in Cenozoic gastropods from southeastern Australia; University of Liverpool

murndaliana
Gastropods described in 1879
Gastropods of Australia